Phoenicus or Phoinikous was a port of ancient Ionia, at the foot of Mount Mimas (modern  Boz Dağ; on the Karaburun Peninsula). Thucydides writes that during the Peloponnesian War after the Battle of Arginusae, the Athenian fleet took refuge in the harbour due to a big storm.
Livy notices it in his account of the naval operations of the Romans and their allies against Antiochus III the Great.

References

Populated places in ancient Ionia
Former populated places in Turkey
Lost ancient cities and towns